Bakarac is a village in Bay of Bakar, Croatia. The settlement is administered as a part of the City of Kraljevica and Primorje-Gorski Kotar County. According to the 2001 census, it has 307 inhabitants. It is connected by the D8 state road.

Sources

Populated coastal places in Croatia
Populated places in Primorje-Gorski Kotar County